Stenodiplosis sorghicola, the sorghum midge, is a species of gall midge in the family Cecidomyiidae. It is a pest of millets. The species is native to Africa and is also found in India. During the rainy season, it feeds on the developing grains of pearl millet plants.

References

Further reading

 
 

Cecidomyiidae
Articles created by Qbugbot
Insects described in 1899
Insect pests of millets